Peter Petroff (21 October 1919 – 27 February 2003) was a Bulgarian American inventor, engineer, NASA scientist, and adventurer. He was involved in the  NASA space program. Petroff assisted in the development of one of the earliest computerized pollution monitoring system and telemetry devices for early weather and communications satellites. He helped develop components of one of the world's first digital watches and an early wireless heart monitor. Petroff founded Care Electronics, Inc. which was acquired by Electro-Data, Inc. of Garland, Texas in autumn 1971.

Petroff Point on Brabant Island in Antarctica is named for Petroff.

References

External links
 Peter Petroff
 Dramatic search for tolerance led great scientist to USA

1919 births
2003 deaths
People from Plovdiv Province
Bulgarian emigrants to the United States
20th-century American physicists
Bulgarian physicists
Bulgarian scientists
Bulgarian inventors
Bulgarian civil engineers
American civil engineers
Bulgarian mechanical engineers
American mechanical engineers
20th-century American inventors